The shortlists for the 2021 CONCACAF Awards were announced on 4 February 2022. The results were announced on 4 April 2022. The ceremony was streamed on YouTube.

Men's football awards

Player of the Year

Best XI

Nominees

Women's football awards

Player of the Year

Best XI

Nominees

References

CONCACAF trophies and awards
Awards
CONCACAF